
Year 652 (DCLII) was a leap year starting on Sunday (link will display the full calendar) of the Julian calendar. The denomination 652 for this year has been used since the early medieval period, when the Anno Domini calendar era became the prevalent method in Europe for naming years.

Events 
 By place 

 Europe 
 King Rothari dies after a 16-year reign, and is succeeded by his son Rodoald as king of the Lombards.

 Britain 
 King Penda of Mercia invades Bernicia, and besieges King Oswiu at Bamburgh, in North East England.

 Arab Empire 
 Arab–Byzantine War: An Arab fleet under Abdullah ibn Sa'ad defeats the Byzantine fleet (500 ships) off the coast of Alexandria.
 Siege of Dongola: A Rashidun army (5,000 men) under Abdullah ibn Sa'ad besieges Dongola in the Kingdom of Makuria (modern Sudan).
 Uthman ibn Affan establishes a treaty (the Baqt) between the Christian Nubians and the Muslims in Egypt, that lasts for six centuries.
 Abdel al Rahman ibn Awf, companion (sahabah) of Muhammad, frees 30,000 slaves at his death (approximate date).

 Asia 
 The registers of population are prepared in Japan. Fifty houses are made a township, and for each township there is appointed an elder. The houses are all associated in groups of five for mutual protection, with one elder to supervise them one with another. This system prevails until the era of World War II.
 The Giant Wild Goose Pagoda is constructed in Chang'an (modern Xi'an), during the Tang Dynasty (China). It is completed in the same year, during the reign of Emperor Gao Zong.

Births 
 Chlothar III, king of Neustria and Burgundy (d. 673)
 Constantine IV, Byzantine emperor (d. 685)
 Li Hong, prince of the Tang Dynasty (d. 675)

Deaths 
 Abbas ibn Abd al-Muttalib, uncle of Muhammad (approximate date)
 Abdel Rahman ibn Awf, companion of Muhammad (approximate date)
 Abu Sufyan ibn Harb, Arabic leader (b. 560)
 Emmeram, bishop of Regensburg (approximate date)
 Itta of Metz, widow of Pippin of Landen (b. 592)
 Li Tai, prince of the Tang Dynasty (b. 618)
 Olympius, exarch of Ravenna
 Rothari, king of the Lombards

References

Sources